Horsley Woodhouse is a village and civil parish in the Amber Valley district of Derbyshire, in the East Midlands of England. The population of the civil parish taken at the 2011 Census was 1,219. It is situated on the A609 road between the neighbouring villages of Kilburn and Smalley.

The name is said to mean "houses in the wood belonging to Horsley", and is often known by its dialect pronunciation "Ossley Woodhus".

Carnival
Each year in July the village hosts a carnival with a parade of floats from the Medical Centre to the showground at the Sitwell Recreation Ground. A prize, the Twins Cup, is awarded to the best float each year. The winner in 2010 was the Pirate Ship created by the Stainsby Avenue residents. The prize was split in 2011 between the Stainsby Avenue residents' Circus float, and the Pre-School's Royal Wedding float. The carnival showground features rides and sideshows and is also the venue for the Amber Valley Marching Bands Contest. The winning band at the 2010 competition was the Derby Midshipmen.

Pubs
The village currently has two pubs: The Old Oak Inn on the main village street, and the Sitwell Arms in the hamlet of Woodside. The Old Oak is owned by a family group including the owner/head brewer of Heanor-based Leadmill Brewery, selling their ales along with those from other small brewers. The pub has won CAMRA pub of the year on a number of occasions. 
 A third pub, The Jolly Colliers, is now closed and was converted into private houses.
as was the Knife and Steel pub, which closed several years ago.

Also in the village until recently was the Ex-servicemen's and Working Men's Club, a private club which held entertainment such as live bands, discos, quiz nights and bingo, before its demolition and replacement in 2017 with a newly built shop, which sees the return of a Co-operative store to the village after an absence of many years.

Notable buildings
To the South-East of the village, almost in Smalley but still within Horsley Woodhouse parish, was Stainsby House. Built in the 1780s, by the end of the 18th Century it had been acquired by the Wilmot-Sitwell family, relatives of the Sitwells of Renishaw Hall through George Sitwell. The Wilmot-Sitwells were great benefactors to the villages of Horsley Woodhouse, Horsley, Smalley and Morley. The present Church Hall in Horsley Woodhouse was originally built as a school in 1869 by the Wilmot-Sitwells. Once the Wilmot-Sitwell line had died out the house was sold and eventually demolished in 1972. A new, futuristic-looking house was then built, also called Stainsby House. This new house was used as a location in the BBC television production of Life and Loves of a She Devil.

Hollies Farm in the centre of the village was built in the late 17th century and was used as a tannery for many years by the Richardson family. This family later moved the business to Derby and eventually to the Eagle Tannery in Sinfin. Hollies Farm has since been demolished, replaced with a street of houses named Hollies Farm Drive.

St Susanna's church was erected in 1882. A Stained glass window was given by the Wilmot-Sitwells.

See also
Listed buildings in Horsley, Derbyshire, and Horsley Woodhouse

References

External links

Civil parishes in Derbyshire
Villages in Derbyshire
Geography of Amber Valley